Ant-Man and the Wasp: Quantumania is a 2023 American superhero film based on Marvel Comics featuring the characters Scott Lang / Ant-Man and Hope Pym / Wasp. Produced by Marvel Studios and distributed by Walt Disney Studios Motion Pictures, it is the sequel to Ant-Man (2015) and Ant-Man and the Wasp (2018) and the 31st film in the Marvel Cinematic Universe (MCU). The film was directed by Peyton Reed, written by Jeff Loveness, and stars Paul Rudd as Scott Lang and Evangeline Lilly as Hope van Dyne, alongside Jonathan Majors, Kathryn Newton, David Dastmalchian, Katy O'Brian, William Jackson Harper, Bill Murray, Michelle Pfeiffer, Corey Stoll, and Michael Douglas. In the film, Lang and Van Dyne are transported to the Quantum Realm along with their family and face Kang the Conqueror (Majors).

Plans for a third Ant-Man film were confirmed in November 2019, with Reed and Rudd returning. Loveness was hired by April 2020, with development on the film beginning during the COVID-19 pandemic. The film's title and new cast members were announced in December 2020. Filming in Turkey began in early February 2021, while additional filming occurred in San Francisco in mid-June, ahead of principal photography starting at the end of July at Pinewood Studios in Buckinghamshire and ending in November.

Ant-Man and the Wasp: Quantumania premiered in Los Angeles on February 6, 2023, and was released in the United States on February 17, 2023, as the first film in Phase Five of the MCU. It received mixed reviews from critics, who praised the performances (particularly those of Rudd, Majors, and Pfeiffer), music, and visual effects but criticized the story, screenplay, and pacing. The film has grossed over $462 million worldwide.

Plot 
During her days of entrapment in the Quantum Realm, Janet van Dyne encounters an exiled traveler named Kang. In the present day, after the Battle of Earth, Scott Lang has become a successful memoirist and has been living happily with his girlfriend, Hope van Dyne. Scott's now-teenage daughter Cassie has become a political activist, resulting in her having a strained relationship with her father. 

While visiting Hope's parents, Hank Pym and Janet, Cassie reveals that she has been working on a device that can establish contact with the Quantum Realm. Upon learning of this, Janet panics and forcefully shuts off the device, but the message is received, resulting in a portal that opens and pulls the five of them into the Quantum Realm. Scott and Cassie are found by natives who are rebelling against their ruler, while Hope, Janet, and Pym explore a sprawling city to get answers.

Hope, Janet, and Pym meet with Lord Krylar, a former ally of Janet's, who reveals that things have changed since she left, and that he is now working for Kang, the Quantum Realm's new ruler. The three are forced to flee and steal Krylar's ship. The Langs, meanwhile, are told by rebel leader Jentorra that Janet's involvement with Kang is indirectly responsible for his rise to power. The rebels soon come under attack by Kang's forces led by M.O.D.O.K., who is revealed to be Darren Cross, having survived his apparent death at Scott's hands. 

Aboard Krylar's ship, Janet confesses to Hope and Pym why she wanted nothing to do with the Quantum Realm again; Kang claimed that he and Janet could both escape from the Quantum Realm if she helped him rebuild his multiversal power core. After they manage to repair it, Janet sees a vision of Kang conquering and destroying entire timelines. Kang reveals he was exiled by his own variants out of fear, which drove Janet to turn on him. Outmatched, Janet used her Pym Particles to enlarge the power core and render it unusable. Kang, having regained his powers, eventually conquered the Quantum Realm afterward.

The Langs are taken to Kang, who demands that Scott helps get his power core back or else he will kill Cassie. Scott is taken to the core's location and shrinks down. He is nearly drowned in a sea of variants of himself, but Hope arrives and helps him acquire the power core. However, Kang reneges on the deal, capturing Janet and destroying her ship with Pym on it. After being rescued by his ants, who were also pulled into the Quantum Realm, rapidly evolved, and became hyper-intelligent, Pym helps Scott and Hope as they make their way to Kang. Cassie rescues Jentorra and they commence an uprising against Kang and his army. During the fight, Cassie convinces Cross to turn sides and fight Kang, though he sacrifices his life in the process. 

Janet fixes the power core as she, Pym, Hope, and Cassie jump through a portal home, but Kang attacks Scott, nearly beating him into submission. Hope returns and, together with Scott, destroy the power core with a combination of Pym Particles and knock Kang into it, causing him to be pulled into oblivion. Cassie reopens the portal on her end for Scott and Hope to return home. As Scott happily resumes his life, he begins to rethink what he was told about Kang's death being the start of something terrible happening, but brushes it off.

In a mid-credits scene, numerous variants of Kang are concerned by Earth-616's increasing interest in the multiverse and plan their uprising. In a post-credits scene, Loki and Mobius M. Mobius locate another Kang variant, named Victor Timely, on Earth in the 1900s.

Cast 

 Paul Rudd as Scott Lang / Ant-Man:An Avenger and former petty criminal with a suit that allows him to shrink or grow in scale while increasing in strength. After the events of Avengers: Endgame (2019), Lang has become a well-known celebrity to the public, as well as the author of an autobiographical book titled Look Out for the Little Guy, which tells a different version of how he helped save the universe from Thanos in Endgame.
 Evangeline Lilly as Hope van Dyne / Wasp:The daughter of Hank Pym and Janet van Dyne who is handed down a similar suit and the Wasp mantle from her mother. She serves as the head of the Pym van Dyne Foundation, which uses the Pym Particles for humanitarian efforts. Lilly said the film would explore how the character deals with her "fragilities and her vulnerabilities", continuing from how Ant-Man and the Wasp (2018) showed how powerful and capable she was.
 Jonathan Majors as Kang the Conqueror:A "time-traveling, multiversal adversary" trapped in the Quantum Realm who needs Pym Particles to get his ship and a device online that would allow him to go anywhere and when in time. Kang is an alternate-timeline variant of the character He Who Remains, the creator of the Time Variance Authority (TVA), who was introduced in the finale of first season of Loki (2021). Kang was described by Loki season one head writer Michael Waldron as the "next big cross-movie villain" for the MCU, while Quantumania writer Jeff Loveness described Kang as a "top-tier, A-list Avengers villain". Majors said Kang is different from He Who Remains, who is not in Quantumania, with a shifted psychology, portraying Kang differently from He Who Remains due to the different characters surrounding him and transitioning from a series to a film. He was attracted to Kang's "character and dimensions" and the potential that presented to him as an actor, noting Kang would be a different type of villain to the MCU than Erik Killmonger and Thanos were, as well as the possibility of playing a complex villain about whom everyone has to be careful, akin to Iago in William Shakespeare's tragedy Othello. Loveness wanted to focus on Kang as a human being by exploring his humanity and vulnerability as a "very lonely" character before he reaches "apocalyptic, Avengers-scale heights". He contrasted this to Thanos by not creating him entirely from computer-generated imagery, and said Kang would be "Thanos on an exponential level". He also said that because the concept of time travel had already been explored in Endgame, he had to broaden his approach to Kang to focus more on the multiverse, his dimensionality, and his "limitless freedom" from his time, and how different versions of the character would destroy it and make it their own. Loveness researched the different versions of Kang from the comics such as Rama-Tut and the Scarlet Centurion and described him as an "infinite snake eating infinite tails" in being "a man literally at war against himself". Director Peyton Reed likened the character to Alexander the Great as a reference point for Majors, who also found inspiration in Genghis Khan and Julius Caesar. Majors said that Kang would be the "supervillain of supervillains" and looked to contrast Tony Stark / Iron Man, who he called the "superhero of superheroes". Majors added  of muscle for the role, focusing on strength and conditioning training. Reed said Quantumania would show a "different flavor" of Majors' approach to Kang's alternate versions and explained that Kang "has dominion over time", calling him a warrior, strategist, and "all-timer antagonist" compared to the antagonists of the prior Ant-Man films as a "force of nature", one that adds "tonal diversity, real conflict and real friction". Given his work with time, Kang does not live a linear life.
 Majors also portrays numerous Kang variants within the Council of Kangs including Immortus, Rama-Tut, and Centurion, as well as the variant Victor Timely.
 Kathryn Newton as Cassie Lang:Scott Lang's 18-year-old daughter who acquires a suit similar to her father's. She is scientifically inclined, and gains an interest in Pym's old notes and learning more about the science and technology from the Quantum Realm. Reed said that he wanted to further develop the relationship between Cassie and Scott, as it was central to the previous Ant-Man films. The character was previously portrayed as a child by Abby Ryder Fortson in the previous Ant-Man films and as a teenager by Emma Fuhrmann in Endgame.
 David Dastmalchian as Veb: A slime-like creature that lives in the Quantum Realm. Dastmalchian previously portrayed Kurt in the first two Ant-Man films.
 Katy O'Brian as Jentorra: The leader of the Freedom Fighters rebelling against Kang's oppression of the communities in the Quantum Realm. O'Brian previously appeared as Kimball in the Marvel Television series Agents of S.H.I.E.L.D.
 William Jackson Harper as Quaz: A telepath who lives in the Quantum Realm.
 Bill Murray as Lord Krylar:The governor of the lavish Axia community in the Quantum Realm, who has a history with Janet van Dyne in the Quantum Realm. Reed believed Murray's character represented a person's past "always find[ing] a way to show up again" and the film's theme of secrets between family members and how they are each affected by them.
 Michelle Pfeiffer as Janet van Dyne: Pym's wife, Hope's mother, and the original Wasp, who was lost in the Quantum Realm for 30 years.
 Corey Stoll as Darren Cross / M.O.D.O.K.:Pym's former protégé who was shrunken to subatomic size in the Quantum Realm during the events of Ant-Man (2015) and became a mutated, cybernetically enhanced individual with an oversized head known as M.O.D.O.K. Loveness described the character as a cross between Kevin Kline's Otto West from A Fish Called Wanda (1988) and Frank Grimes from The Simpsons season eight episode "Homer's Enemy" (1997). Loveness felt M.O.D.O.K. to be his favorite character in the film because they put a "little extra" on him, and said M.O.D.O.K.'s ego would be crumbled throughout the film whenever he is challenged, but like Otto West, easily kills as a "real loose cannon".
 Michael Douglas as Hank Pym:A former S.H.I.E.L.D. agent, entomologist, and physicist who became the original Ant-Man after creating the suit. In the film, Pym was written to be more "relaxed" than in previous MCU appearances, as he is more focused on reacquainting with Janet than his work. As a result, Broussard described Pym as "a little more sure of himself" and "not looking around every corner". Loveness believed that Pym's fascination with ants, a trait only comically referenced previously, was a critical hallmark of the character, and thus decided to expand on it in the film. Broussard felt the expansion was "a weird thing ... but also awesome ... a bit of an acknowledgment of ... a weird obsession for this guy who's totally owned it."

Additionally, Randall Park briefly reprises his role as FBI agent Jimmy Woo from previous MCU media, along with Gregg Turkington as Baskin-Robbins store manager Dale from Ant-Man. Ruben Rabasa appears as a coffee shop attendant. A man asking Lang for a picture with his dog is played by Mark Oliver Everett, frontman of the rock band Eels, whose father was quantum physicist Hugh Everett III and the originator of the many-worlds interpretation of quantum theory. The film's post-credits scene features uncredited cameo appearances by Tom Hiddleston and Owen Wilson, reprising their respective roles as Loki and Mobius M. Mobius from Loki.

Production

Development 
Ahead of the release of Ant-Man and the Wasp (2018), director Peyton Reed said there were elements of that film that leave "a lot to play with" in a potential third film in the franchise. He highlighted the Quantum Realm, which was introduced in Ant-Man (2015) and explored further in Ant-Man and the Wasp; Reed said they were "just dipping our toes into it" for the previous films. Reed added that he and Marvel Studios were hopeful about a third film and had discussed potential story points for such a sequel. In February 2019, Hank Pym actor Michael Douglas confirmed that informal discussions regarding a sequel to Ant-Man and the Wasp had taken place, though by that time Evangeline Lilly had not heard of any plans for her character Hope van Dyne / Wasp following her role in Avengers: Endgame (2019). Lilly stated that "Hope is mid-journey. I don't see her journey as being over by any stretch." That October, Michelle Pfeiffer expressed interest in reprising her role of Janet van Dyne in a sequel, while Marvel Studios President Kevin Feige was asked about the future of Paul Rudd's Scott Lang / Ant-Man in the Marvel Cinematic Universe (MCU) following Endgame, and responded that "the chess pieces were arranged very purposefully" at the end of that film, with some taken "off the board" and others, like Ant-Man, "still on [the board, so] you never know". Rudd was asked whether he would be returning to the role, either in a third Ant-Man film or as part of another hero's MCU franchise, and said that both of those options had been discussed.

Reed officially signed on to direct a third Ant-Man film at the start of November 2019. Rudd was set to star as Lang, with Lilly and Douglas also returning. Filming was scheduled to begin in January 2021 with a likely release date in 2022. Reed was hired again, despite Marvel's interest in new filmmakers bringing different takes to their heroes for each film, because executives felt he had "a real grasp on the Ant-Man universe and want[ed] to see him return to wrap up his trilogy". Jeff Loveness was hired to write the script for the film during "the early days of Hollywood's shutdown" due to the COVID-19 pandemic, and he had begun working on the screenplay by April 2020. At that point, it was no longer clear when production would begin on the film due to the effects of the pandemic on all film productions. In August 2020, Reed confirmed that development on the film was continuing during the pandemic. He said that Lilly would continue to get equal billing in the film alongside Rudd as she is "a very, very important part" of the partnership between Ant-Man and the Wasp, despite rumors that her role would be reduced following controversial comments about the pandemic. Reed added that the story for the film had been "cracked", though "nothing [was] official yet", and said the third film would be a "bigger, more sprawling movie than the first two [with] a very different visual template". Reed stated they wanted to further explore the Quantum Realm in the film as a "massive world-building undertaking", and compared its design to electron microscope photography, the Heavy Metal magazine issues of the 1970s and 1980s and his favorite science fiction cover artists such as Jean Giraud for fantastical realism. Marvel Studios producer Brian Gay said the film would "feel like a real departure" from the first two Ant-Man films and be a big adventure. Fellow Marvel Studios executive Stephen Broussard was producing the film alongside Feige.

Pre-production 
In September 2020, Jonathan Majors was cast in a "lead role" for the film, which was reported to be Kang the Conqueror. Because the actor cast as Kang would first portray an alternate version of the character, named He Who Remains, in the Disney+ series Loki, Kate Herron and Michael Waldron—the director and head writer of Loki first season, respectively—were involved in casting Majors in addition to Reed and executives at Marvel Studios; Marvel Studios were eager to work with and cast Majors after seeing his performance in The Last Black Man in San Francisco (2019), with Reed very supportive of approaching Majors. Majors was approached for the role without an audition, and later noted he had been involved in the film "since the beginning" before joining Loki. Reed was interested in having Ant-Man and the Wasp go up against a formidable foe in the film, believing Kang to be one of Marvel Comics' "all-timers" like Loki and Doctor Doom.

In November 2020, filming was expected to start in 2021. In December, Pfeiffer confirmed her involvement and that filming would begin in mid-2021. Shortly after at Disney's Investor Day, Feige revealed the film's title as Ant-Man and the Wasp: Quantumania, confirmed the return of Rudd, Lilly, Douglas and Pfeiffer, alongside Majors as Kang, and revealed that Kathryn Newton had joined the film as Cassie Lang. Emma Fuhrmann, who played the character as a teenager in Avengers: Endgame, was saddened by the announcement of Newton taking over the role, and hoped to be involved in the MCU in the future. Later that month, Loveness revealed that he had turned in the first draft of the script, and said Marvel had used the COVID-19 pandemic break to "do something new and weird" with the film. Loveness was inspired by several "father and daughter" films starring Steve Martin or Robin Williams from the 1990s, like Father of the Bride, Hook (both 1991) and Jumanji (1995), with Loveness feeling that because he admired all those father characters, he could mix the "underdog dad" hero energy with Rudd's likability to make it a through line for the film. Broussard described the film as a "family adventure" film that becomes "an epic sci-fi war movie and a coming-of-age story". Pfeiffer and Douglas both indicated that the film would be released in 2022.

On February 4, 2021, Turkey's Minister of Culture and Tourism Mehmet Ersoy announced that shooting for the film had begun in the country's region of Cappadocia, with the production also set to film in other parts of Turkey. At the beginning of March, Tip "T.I." Harris was revealed to not be returning as his character Dave from the first two Ant-Man films. This news came after sexual abuse allegations against Harris and his wife Tameka Cottle arose at the end of February, but Variety reported that this was unrelated and Harris was never set to return for the sequel. In early May 2021, Marvel Studios announced that the film would be released on February 17, 2023. In mid-June, Rudd and Douglas headed to England to prepare for filming. Shooting to capture exterior shots and background plates took place at the San Francisco Police Department Central Station in North Beach, San Francisco on June 19 and 20, with filming of the station's interior, the outward view of the building, and downtown San Francisco. In July, Joanna Robinson of Vanity Fair reported that Corey Stoll, who portrayed Darren Cross / Yellowjacket in Ant-Man, would appear in "some shape" for Quantumania. Reed planned to feature comedian Tom Scharpling again in the film, after his cameos in the previous two films were ultimately cut from the theatrical releases; however, the scene in which he would have been featured was cut before it was filmed.

Filming 
Principal photography began on July 26, 2021, at Pinewood Studios in Buckinghamshire, using the working title Dust Bunny, with William Pope serving as cinematographer. Industrial Light & Magic provided the same StageCraft virtual production technology Reed used while directing episodes of the Disney+ Star Wars series The Mandalorian. Will Htay served as production designer. Principal photography was previously set to begin in January 2021 but was postponed due to the COVID-19 pandemic. It was then expected to take place between May 31 and September 24. By September 16, over 50 crew members from Pinewood Studios productions, including Quantumania, contracted norovirus following an outbreak at the studio. The main cast was not affected. In October, the film's release was delayed to July 28, 2023. Later that month, Bill Murray revealed he had shot material for a Marvel film with Reed, which was believed to be Quantumania. Murray explained he joined the project as he liked Reed and his work on Bring It On (2000), despite not being interested in superhero films, before he further indicated his involvement in the film, but said he could not comment on his prior statement; Murray later said he was playing a "bad guy" in the film. Principal photography was completed in November 2021. Filming was also expected to take place in Atlanta, and the production was slated to move to San Francisco in 2022 with the cast.

Post-production 
Adam Gerstel and Laura Jennings serve as co-editors on the film, while Jesse James Chisholm is the visual effects supervisor. In April 2022, the film was moved back to its February 17, 2023, release date, swapping places with The Marvels given Quantumania was further along in production than that film. In September 2022, Randall Park was confirmed to be reprising his role as Jimmy Woo, and Feige called the film "a direct line" into Phase Five and Avengers: The Kang Dynasty (2025), with Majors reprising his role in The Kang Dynasty. Reed stated that Quantumania would have a "profound impact" on the MCU and that the impact of Kang's appearance in this film was discussed with Loveness for The Kang Dynasty, which he was also writing. Loveness felt that having Kang as the main villain of Quantumania would set up the dynamic story he was developing for The Kang Dynasty. Reed also hoped the film would not be viewed as a "palate cleanser" the previous two films had been following Avengers films, but would instead feel as big as an Avengers film. Gregg Turkington was also revealed to be reprising his role as Dale, a Baskin-Robbins manager, from Ant-Man. In October 2022, William Jackson Harper was revealed to be appearing in the film in an undisclosed role, and in November, Katy O'Brian was revealed to be appearing in the film alongside David Dastmalchian, who portrayed Kurt in the first two films, after he previously said he was not involved in Quantumania. In January 2023, Dastmalchian, Harper, O'Brian, Murray, and Stoll were revealed to be playing Veb, Quaz, Jentorra, Lord Krylar, and M.O.D.O.K., respectively. Pick-up shots with Rudd occurred by then.

The film's mid-credits scene sees the introduction of the Council of Kangs, particularly Immortus, Rama-Tut, and Centurion. These variants, all portrayed by Majors, discuss how the Conqueror has been killed and that the Avengers are starting to infringe on the multiverse and what they have built. This leads to hundreds of other Kang variants filling an area, in a shot reminiscent of the Council's first appearance in comics in The Avengers #292. The post-credits scene is a scene from the second season of Loki, with Majors appearing as Victor Timely, a Kang variant, and Tom Hiddleston and Owen Wilson reprising their respective Loki roles of Loki and Mobius M. Mobius. The film's main-on-end title sequence was designed by Perception, who emulated the visuals of the Quantum Realm using fluid motion and microscopic chemical reactions.

In March 2023, Marvel Studios filed a request to issue a subpoena to Reddit to identify the person or group who was responsible for leaking the script and subtitle file for the film in January 2023 to the subreddit r/MarvelStudiosSpoilers, as well as a subpoena to Google since the leaked information had been uploaded to Google Docs. As a result of the request, r/MarvelStudiosSpoilers was shut down and made into a private subreddit.

Music 

Christophe Beck was revealed to be composing the score by July 2022, after previously working on the previous two Ant-Man films, as well as the MCU Disney+ series WandaVision and Hawkeye (both in 2021). The soundtrack album was released digitally by Hollywood Records and Marvel Music on February 15, 2023, with its first track, "Theme from Quantumania", released as a digital single on February 12.

Marketing 
The first footage from the film was shown at the 2022 San Diego Comic-Con where Feige, Reed, and the cast promoted the film and discussed the characters. Further footage was shown at D23 in September, which Ryan Leston at IGN called "an intriguing glimpse" into the film. A teaser trailer for the film was released on October 24, 2022. It featured "Goodbye Yellow Brick Road" by Elton John. Tom Chapman at Den of Geek noted the trailer was "darker than ever" compared to the comedic tone of the prior two Ant-Man films and featured "dramatic pauses and tense musical cues", but felt it was "another MCU teaser trailer that does a little too much teasing" to not reveal key details, such as the absence of the character M.O.D.O.K. who was shown in the D23 footage. Charles Pulliuam-Moore of The Verge compared the trailer to Disney's then-upcoming film Strange World (2022) and highlighted the Quantum Realm's appearance as being "beautiful and nonsensical," while Empire Owen Williams compared the Quantum Realm to Ego's planet from the MCU film Guardians of the Galaxy Vol. 2 (2017).

A new trailer for the film debuted during the 2023 College Football Playoff National Championship on January 9 before it was released online. Daniel Chin of The Ringer noted the trailer had revealed "a lot" as compared to the teaser one, including the lay out of the film's plot and the first look at M.O.D.O.K. Chin felt the trailer had featured "some misdirections... but it seems to supply more advance knowledge than Marvel typically dispenses." That month, Heineken released a commercial featuring Rudd to promote their non-alcoholic beer and the film. The following month, Volkswagen released a commercial that was directed by Anthony Leonardi III to promote the film and their SUV model ID.4. Additionally, Lang's fictional memoir, Look Out for the Little Guy, was announced to be published by Hyperion Avenue, created alongside Marvel Studios and the filmmakers, and will be available on September 5, 2023. It features "over 20 short pieces exploring different aspects of Scott's experiences" as a father and Avenger, and was written by Rob Kutner. Loveness wrote the passages that were featured in the film.

Release 
Ant-Man and the Wasp: Quantumania had its world premiere at Regency Village Theatre in Westwood, Los Angeles on February 6, 2023, and was released in the United States and China on February 17, 2023. The film was previously set to be released in 2022, before being officially announced as releasing on February 17, 2023, in May 2021. It was delayed to July 28, 2023, in October 2021, and returned to the February 2023 date in April 2022. It is the first film of Phase Five of the MCU.

Reception

Box office 
, Ant-Man and the Wasp: Quantumania has grossed $205.8 million in the United States and Canada, and $256.8 million in other territories, for a worldwide total of $462.6 million.

In January 2023, Ant-Man and the Wasp: Quantumania was projected to earn $120 million in North America over the four-day Presidents' Day opening weekend. The following month, it was projected to debut to $105–110 million domestically and $280 million globally in its opening weekend. The film made $46 million on its first day, including $17.5 million from Thursday previews that began at 3 P.M. It went on to debut to $106.1 million (and a total of $120.4 million over the four-day frame), marking the best opening of the Ant-Man series and the third-best for a February release, behind Black Panther ($242.1 million in 2018) and Deadpool ($152.1 million in 2016). The film's second weekend saw a 69% drop, down to $32 million in North America, the largest second-week domestic drop-off of any Marvel Cinematic Universe film. In its third weekend, the film earned $12.4 million, for a drop of 61%.

Outside the United States and Canada, the film grossed $121.3 million in its opening weekend. In its second weekend, the film earned $46.4 million, for a drop of 57%, and remained the number one non-local movie in most markets. The film grossed $22 million from 52 markets in its third weekend, for a decline of 53%.The top 5 markets are China ($39M), the UK ($22.1M), Mexico ($17.4M), France ($12.6M) and Korea ($12.5M).

Critical response 
The review aggregator website Rotten Tomatoes reported an approval rating of 47% with an average rating of 5.6/10, based on 376 reviews. The site's critics consensus reads: "Ant-Man and the Wasp: Quantumania mostly lacks the spark of fun that elevated earlier adventures, but Jonathan Majors' Kang is a thrilling villain poised to alter the course of the MCU." On Metacritic, the film has a weighted average score of 48 out of 100, based on 61 critics, indicating "mixed or average reviews". Audiences polled by CinemaScore gave the film an average grade of "B" on an A+ to F scale, and those polled by PostTrak reported 75% of audience members gave the film a positive score, with 60% saying they would definitely recommend it.

Owen Gleiberman from Variety was critical of the film, calling it "at once fun and numbing" and stating "...if this is what Phase 5 looks like, God save us from Phases 6, 7 and 8." Caryn James from the BBC stated that the movie has "Marvel's next big villain but other than that, it has nothing to offer beyond drab-looking action." Wendy Ide from The Guardian called Majors' performance the film's "magnetic core", but said that overall the film was "baffling and illogical". Ross Bonaime from Collider also praised Majors' performance, writing he "makes for an excellent villain, who brings nuance and subtlety to his character ... Majors makes this character [Kang] likable in the beginning, but also never hides the menace and terror that he can cause at any moment." Giving the film a B-, Bonaime stated: "Quantumania is a promising, but shaky start for Phase 5 of the Marvel Cinematic Universe, it's just a shame it comes at the sake of the little guy." Frank Scheck of The Hollywood Reporter commended Majors for "bringing real gravitas" to the film, and investing "his performance with such an arrestingly quiet stillness and ambivalence that you're on edge every moment he's onscreen." Scheck also praised Pfeiffer, writing she "is terrific in her expanded role, given the opportunity to be a badass heroine and making the most of it." Manohla Dargis from The New York Times felt Pfeiffer, Majors and Douglas were the "truer stars of this show", but felt the overall film was "busy, noisy and thoroughly uninspired".

Richard Roeper of Chicago Sun-Times rated the film three out of four stars, writing it is a "mid-tier MCU film, with decent enough battle sequences and some nifty visuals". Leah Greenblatt of Entertainment Weekly graded the film a B+, concluding: "At just over 120 minutes, though — a blink in Marvel time — this Ant-Man is clever enough to be fun, and wise enough not overstay its welcome. Who better understands the benefits, after all, of keeping it small?" Michael Phillips of the Chicago Tribune gave the film two stars out of four, stating it is "less fun, and blandly garish visually. The earlier films' throwaway jokes and welcome aversion to brutal solemnity have largely been ditched in favor of endless endgame stuff and weirdly cheesy digital world-building in the Quantum Realm." Similarly, David Sims of The Atlantic disapprovingly compared the film to the first two entries, writing in his review: "That cleverness, combined with the special-effect goofiness of people and objects getting big and small, powered the series—and it is basically been junked here, replaced by a bunch of celestial showdowns between Kang and Ant-Man. Anytime Quantumania allows itself to get a little silly, it's in much better shape."

Accolades 
Ant-Man and the Wasp: Quantumania received a nomination for Best Music Supervision in a Trailer – Film at the 2023 Guild of Music Supervisors Awards.

Future 
In February 2023, Douglas said he would be interested in returning for a fourth film if Pym died in it, while Broussard said that he had started to discuss a potential fourth film with Feige and Reed.

Notes

References

External links 

  at Marvel.com
 

2020s American films
2020s English-language films
2020s science fiction adventure films
2020s superhero films
2023 adventure films
2023 science fiction action films
4DX films
American science fiction action films
American science fiction adventure films
American sequel films
Ant-Man (film series)
Films about ants
Films about parallel universes
Films about quantum mechanics
Films about size change
Films directed by Peyton Reed
Films scored by Christophe Beck
Films set in San Francisco
Films shot at Pinewood Studios
Films shot in Atlanta
Films shot in London
Films shot in San Francisco
Films shot in Turkey
Films using motion capture
Marvel Cinematic Universe: Phase Five films
Productions using StageCraft
Superhero crossover films
Superheroine films
Works by Jeff Loveness